Katharine Coles is an American poet and educator. She served from 2006 to 2012 as Utah's third poet laureate and currently serves as the inaugural director of the Harriet Monroe Poetry Institute and the co-director of the Utah Symposium in Science and Literature.

Biography
Coles earned her Bachelor of Arts from the University of Washington. She later earned a master's degree from the University of Houston and her Ph.D. from the University of Utah. In 1997 she joined the faculty at the University of Utah.

Her published works include the novels Fire Season and The Measurable World, and five collections of poems: Fault, The Golden Years of the Fourth Dimension, A History of the Garden, The One Right Touch, and Flight. She has also contributed stories, poems, and essays to The Paris Review, The New Republic, The Kenyon Review, Image, Upstreet, and Poetry.

Awards and honors
Coles received the PEN New Writer’s Award in 1992. Her 2001 poetry collection, The Golden Years of the Fourth Dimension, received the Utah Book Award. In 2012, she was awarded a Guggenheim Fellowship.

Selected works

Biography/Memoir
Look Both Ways, 2018

Novels
The Measurable World, 1995
Fire Season, 2005

Poetry
The One Right Touch, 1992
The Golden Years of the Fourth Dimension,  2001
Fault, 2008
The Earth Is Not Flat, 2013
Flight, 2016
Wayward, 2019
Sestina in Prose

References

External links
"Poetry Foundation Bio"

20th-century American novelists
21st-century American novelists
20th-century American poets
21st-century American poets
University of Washington alumni
University of Utah faculty
Living people
Poets from Utah
Poets Laureate of Utah
Novelists from Utah
Year of birth missing (living people)